Milan Karlíček (born February 6, 1981) is a Czech former professional ice hockey defenceman.

Karlíček played nine games in the Czech Extraliga, two for HC Barum Continental Zlín during the 1999–2000 season and seven for HC Oceláři Třinec during the 2003–04 season. He also played in the Polska Liga Hokejowa for GKS Katowice and JKH GKS Jastrzębie and in the Tipsport Liga in Slovakia for HK 36 Skalica.

References

External links

1981 births
Living people
Czech ice hockey defencemen
EHC Freiburg players
HC Havířov players
SHK Hodonín players
JKH GKS Jastrzębie players
LHK Jestřábi Prostějov players
GKS Katowice (ice hockey) players
HC Kometa Brno players
HC Oceláři Třinec players
HK 36 Skalica players
Sportspeople from Zlín
Hokej Šumperk 2003 players
Stadion Hradec Králové players
PSG Berani Zlín players
Czech expatriate ice hockey players in Slovakia
Czech expatriate ice hockey players in Germany
Czech expatriate sportspeople in Poland
Expatriate ice hockey players in Poland